The Ransom is a 1977 American thriller film directed by Richard Compton and starring Oliver Reed, Deborah Raffin, Stuart Whitman and James Mitchum. It is also known by the alternative titles Assault in Paradise and Maniac.

Plot

Cast
 Oliver Reed as Nick McCormick 
 Deborah Raffin as Cindy Simmons 
 Stuart Whitman as William Whitaker 
 James Mitchum as Tracker 
 John Ireland as Chief Haliburton 
 Paul Koslo as Victor 
 Arch Archambault as Insp. Davey 
 Robert Lussier as Wolf 
 Dennis Redfield as Jackson 
 Kipp Whitman as Officer Steiner 
 Bill Allen as Carson the Butler 
 Daniel Knapp as T.J. Caulfield

Production
In a 1978 interview with the Los Angeles Times, co-screenwriter Ronald Silkosky said that the film had been heavily trimmed by New World Pictures prior to release.

Release 
The film was rereleased several times with titles such as Assault in Paradise, Maniac, The Town That Cried Terror and Night Hunter.

An extended 104-minute alternate version is included as a bonus feature on the Blu-ray disc release of the film by Code Red.

References

Bibliography
 Alastair Phillips & Ginette Vincendeau. Journeys of desire: European actors in Hollywood : a critical companion. BFI, 2006.

External links
 
 
 

1977 films
1970s thriller films
American thriller films
Films directed by Richard Compton
New World Pictures films
1970s English-language films
1970s American films